James "Jim" Yorke (October 28, 1962 – June 21, 2008) was an American ice dancer. Competing in partnership with Eleanor DeVera, he won silver medals at the 1983 Nebelhorn Trophy and Grand Prix International St. Gervais. He later competed with Ann Hensel where he won the 1987 Eastern sectionals, placed 6th at US national championships, and member of the international team.  In 1988 Jim teamed up with Renee Roca where he won the gold medal at the 1987 Prague Skate and bronze at the 1988 Skate America.

After ending his amateur career, Yorke skated professionally with Judy Blumberg and Kim Callahan. He worked as a coach at the Los Angeles Figure Skating Club, notably working with Mirai Nagasu. He died at his California home on June 21, 2008.

Results

With Roca

With Hensel

With DeVera

References

American male ice dancers
1962 births
2008 deaths